Flaxley Abbey is a former Cistercian monastery in England, now a Grade I listed manor and private residence, near the village of Flaxley in the Forest of Dean, Gloucestershire. It is the former seat of the Crawley-Boevey Baronets.

History

Foundation and background
Flaxley Abbey was founded in 1151 by Roger Fitzmiles, 2nd Earl of Hereford as a  Cistercian monastery. It was allegedly founded on the spot where his father Miles, 1st Earl of Hereford was killed during a hunting in the Forest of Dean in 1143. 
The monks who built the abbey came from Bordesley Abbey founded in Worcestershire in 1138. In the late 12th century, it was noted that Pope Celestine III and Pope Alexander III granted the monks of Flaxley Abbey special immunity from tithes.

The monastery came under royal protection during the reign of King Henry II and was used as a royal hunting quarters. In 1227 King Henry III gave a grant to Flaxley Abbey to the woods, called Abbot's Woods. King Edward III, who paid frequent visits to Flaxley Abbey, granted to Flaxley Abbey income from the rents and profits of the lands of the Forest of Dean in 1353.

Dissolution
Flaxley Abbey was eventually dissolved during the Dissolution of the Monasteries on 4 September 1536. On 21 March 1537 the abbey and its lands were granted to Sir William Kingston, Constable of the Tower of London during much of the reign of Henry VIII, who superintended the execution of Queen Anne Boleyn. During this time the west and south wings of the abbey were converted into a manor.

The Crawley-Boevey family

Flaxley Abbey was purchased in 1648 by the London merchant, lawyer and philosopher James Boevey (1622–1696), with his half-brother William. Later resident Catherina Boevey, an inheritance from her short marriage to William Boevey (James Boevey's son), passed the house to Thomas Crawley (later styled Crawley-Boevey) at her death in 1727.

The family was created as the Crawley-Boevey Baronets (originally Barrow Baronetcy) on 22 January 1784. During this time the house was substantially rebuilt by the designs of architect Anthony Keck. As baronets the manor and the estate continued to pass down from father to eldest son. Flaxley Abbey remained as the family home until 1960.

Gardens and landscape
After the death of William Boevey, his wife Catherina Boevey completed Dutch-style gardens on the grounds of Flaxley Abbey. It is said that Maynard I Colchester, a close friend of Catherina, was influenced by her own canal gardens for his Westbury Court Garden. The layout of the gardens and improvements to  Flaxley Abbey were continued by her after her husband's death. However, due to the modification of the land, the Dutch-style gardens at Flaxley Abbey were eventually removed. Between 1962 and 1963 a new modern style garden as well as the manor's interior were redesigned by Tony Award winning theater and set designer Oliver Messel.

Notable visitors
King John I of England Itinerary of King John.
Henry III of England
King Edward III
Queen Mary of England (Teck) in 1945.

Notable residents
Matilda Blanche Crawley-Boevey, wife of famed Victorian businessman William Gibbs of Tyntesfield and daughter of Sir Thomas Crawley-Boevey, 3rd Baronet.
Arthur William Crawley-Boevey, author, Acting Chief Presidency Magistrate of Bombay, married daughter of Colonel Robert Phayre (Brother of Arthur Purves Phayre Governor of Mauritius), in 1883. Service in India from 1868 to 1893. Author of The Cartulary and Historical Notes of the Cistercian Abbey of Flaxley (1887). Son of Sir Martin Hyde Crawley-Boevey, 4th Baronet.
Sybella Mary Crawley-Boevey, Victorian author, author of Dene Forest Sketches (1888), Beyond Cloudland (1888) and Conscience Makes the Martyr (1894). Daughter of Sir Martin Hyde Crawley-Boevey, 4th Baronet.

References

External links

 at parksandgardens.ac.uk
 photos of Flaxley Abbey and surrounding area on geograph
 Flaxley Abbey on Pinterest

Country houses in Gloucestershire
Grade I listed buildings in Gloucestershire
Grade I listed houses
Grade I listed monasteries
Monasteries in Gloucestershire
Cistercian monasteries in England
1151 establishments in England
1530s disestablishments in England
Forest of Dean